Shyam Sunder Paliwal is a social activist from balotra village in balotra district in the Indian state of Rajasthan. He was awarded Padma Shri by President of India for social service in 2021. He is known as the "Father of Eco-Feminism".

He lost his daughter in 2006, since then 111 saplings are planted every time a girl child is born in Piplantri village.

References

1964 births
Living people
People from Rajsamand district
Recipients of the Padma Shri in social work
Social workers from Rajasthan